The Oroville Mercury-Register is a daily newspaper in the town of Oroville, California. It is owned by Digital First Media, formerly MediaNews Group. MediaNews Group took control of the paper from Donrey in 1999. It publishes Tuesday through Sunday with a circulation of 5,852. The Mercury-Register has been an edition of the Chico Enterprise-Record since 1996, with a combined circulation of 31,488 as of March 2007.

References

External links
 

Daily newspapers published in California
Oroville, California
MediaNews Group publications